Isostyla is a genus of moths of the family Notodontidae. It consists of the following species:
Isostyla biquadrata  Prout, 1918
Isostyla ithomeina  (Butler, 1872) 
Isostyla picata  (Warren, 1900) 
Isostyla purefacta  Prout, 1918
Isostyla zetila  (Boisduval, 1870) 

Notodontidae of South America